Robert J. "Bob" Leeper (born December 8, 1958) is an American independent politician and chiropractor. He was a member of the Kentucky State Senate from 1991 to 2015 retiring to run for McCracken County Judge-Executive. In 2014, he was elected Judge-Executive of McCracken County, but chose not to seek reelection in 2018.

Education 
Leeper attended Paducah Community College and Sherman College of Chiropractic.

Political career 
Prior to serving in the Kentucky State Senate, Leeper was a city commissioner in Paducah.

Kentucky State Senate 
Originally a Democrat, Leeper joined the Republican Party in 2000, and became a political independent later in the decade. Leeper has been described as an "ultra-conservative independent", and was known in the legislature for his opposition to expanded gambling. In 2012, he mounted an unsuccessful candidacy to serve as president of the Kentucky State Senate. He decided against re-election in 2014 and ran for McCracken County Judge-Executive.

Judge-Executive of McCracken County 
In 2014, Leeper was elected Judge-Executive of McCracken County. In 2018, he faced criticism over the termination of Paducah Economic Development president and CEO Scott Darnell, and issued a statement saying he would not answer questions about the matter. He did not seek reelection in 2018.

Honors 
In 2020, he was honored with the opening of the Bob Leeper Bridge, a 110-foot pedestrian bridge in McCracken County.

References

External links 
 Senate District 2: Senator Bob Leeper (I) at Kentucky Legislature

1958 births
Living people
Place of birth missing (living people)
Kentucky state senators
Kentucky Independents
People from Paducah, Kentucky
Baptists from Kentucky
American chiropractors
Sherman College of Chiropractic alumni